The Educator 64, also known as the PET 64 and Model 4064, was a microcomputer made by Commodore Business Machines in 1983. It was sold to schools as a replacement for aging Commodore PET systems. Schools were reluctant to adopt the Commodore 64 "breadbox" design due to theft or vandalism of the smaller, more exposed components. The 4064 designation followed in line with the PET's 4008, 4016 and 4032 models as a 64 KB 40-column model.

The internals of the Educator 64 were refurbished Commodore 64 motherboards and monochromatic green monitors. The area above the keyboard contained a quick reference card for BASIC 2.0 and Commodore DOS commands. The only differences between the Educator 64 and the other 64 models were the graphics capabilities, the built-in speaker, the sound amplifier with volume control, the 3.5 mm mini-jack for mono sound output to headphones, the internal power supply, and the keyboard which is missing the color abbreviations imprinted on the front edge of the number keys. The Educator 64 retained the ability to display shades of green, while the PET 64 and 4064 were monochrome-only. Though the PET 4008/4016/4032 computers had cases made entirely of metal, only the Educator 64's base was metal—the upper case was made of thick plastic.

The Educator 64 was not sold in great numbers. It suffered from its monochrome display most Commodore 64 software assumed the availability of color. And, by that time, the US education market was firmly in Apple's grasp.

External links
The C64 is Schoolbound
Secret Weapons of Commodore
Commodore EDUCATOR 64 Model 4064

Commodore 8-bit computers